Majid bin Abdullah Al Qasabi is the Minister of Commerce and former acting Minister of Media of Saudi Arabia.

Early life and education
Majid Bin Abdullah Al Qasabi was born in Jeddah in 1959. His father Abdullah bin Othman Al Qasabi was a prominent Saudi real estate owner and businessman.

Majid Al Qasabi pursued his university education in the US, receiving a bachelor's degree in civil engineering in 1981 from the University of Portland. In 1982 he obtained a master's degree in civil engineering from U.C. Berkeley, followed by another master's degree in engineering management, and a PhD in engineering management from the University of Missouri–Rolla (now Missouri University of Science and Technology), obtained in 1985.

Al Qasabi taught between 1987 and 1998 as an assistant professor as the King Abdulaziz University, in the Industrial Engineering Department.

Career
In 1998, Al Qasabi left the King Abdulaziz University to become Secretary General of the Jeddah Chamber of Commerce & Industry, a role which he held until 2002.

In 2002, he served as director-general of the Sultan bin Abdulaziz Al Saud Foundation and became an advisor at the Crown Prince's Court in 2010, and president of Special Affairs for Crown Prince Sultan and his two successors between 2011 and 2014.

Al Qasabi was named minister of social affairs of Saudi Arabia by royal decree on 29 January 2015. Within the first 100 days of his appointment, a center for studies and research called Nama (growth in Arabic) was set up in Riyadh, to follow up on all initiatives carried out by the Ministry of Social Affairs.

Acting minister of media
He was appointed by royal decree on 25 February 2020 as acting minister of media replacing Turki Al Shabana in the post.

Minister of commerce and investment
Al Qasabi was appointed as minister of commerce and investment on 7 May 2016 via royal decree, replacing Tawfig Al Rabiah in the post.

Leading the ministry Al Qasabi is in charge of implementing structural reform in line with Saudi Arabia's national plan Vision 2030. Accordingly, the nation's foreign investment license provider, The Saudi Arabian General Investment Authority (SAGIA) was built into the ministry of commerce and investment.

In 2016, the General Authority for Small and Medium Enterprises was established, and held its first board of directors' meeting in November 2016. The authority was established by the Council of Ministers and headed by Al Qasabi.

Under his leadership, Saudi Arabia allowed full ownership by foreign investors in firms belonging to the health and education sectors in the country, as well as the engineering services companies.

Other responsibilities
Member of the boards of several major Saudi charities
Member of the Council of the Saudi Ports Authority Management
Member of the High Commission for the Development of Ha’il
Member of the Centennial Fund
Member of the Council of Economic and Development Affairs (Saudi Arabia)

References

Majid
Majid
Majid
1959 births
Information ministers of Saudi Arabia
Social affairs ministers of Saudi Arabia
Trade ministers of Saudi Arabia
Academic staff of King Abdulaziz University
Living people
Missouri University of Science and Technology alumni
People from Jeddah
University of Portland alumni
University of California, Berkeley alumni
Saudi Arabian civil engineers